Helen Lewis (born 30 September 1983) is a British journalist and a staff writer at The Atlantic. She is a former deputy editor of the New Statesman, and has also written for The Guardian and The Sunday Times.

Career
After graduating, she gained a post-graduate diploma in newspaper journalism from London's City University. Subsequently, she was accepted on the Daily Mail programme for trainee sub-editors, working in the job for a few years, and later joining the team responsible for commissioning features for the newspaper. She was appointed the Women in the Humanities Honorary Writing Fellow at Oxford University for 2018/2019, and since 2019 is on the steering committee for the Reuters Institute for Journalism at Oxford University, where she delivered a lecture on "The Failures of Political Journalism," subsequently adapted as a New Statesman cover story.

Lewis was appointed as deputy editor of the New Statesman in May 2012, after becoming assistant editor in 2010. Since July 2019, she has been a staff writer at The Atlantic.

In September 2018, Lewis interviewed Jordan Peterson for GQ, in a video which has been viewed over 60 million times.

In November 2019, April 2020, October 2020, April 2021 and November 2021 Lewis was a panellist on BBC's Have I Got News for You.

Difficult Women
Lewis's first book Difficult Women: A History of Feminism in 11 Fights, a history of the battles for women's rights, was published by Jonathan Cape on 27 February 2020. Difficult Women was featured in the New Statesman under "Books to Read in 2020", and in the Observer list of "Non-fiction Books to Look Out for in 2020".

Broadcast
In December 2019, Lewis launched her Radio 4 series, The Spark, a longform interview series with each episode dedicated to a single guest (or, in one case, two co-authors). The first four series have been collected by Penguin as an audiobook.

In September 2021, the BBC aired her comedy documentary series Great Wives.

In December 2022, Helen Lewis' eight-part podcast called The New Gurus aired on BBC Radio 4. In it, she investigated the popularity and influence of charismatic individuals from Russell Brand to Jordan Peterson.

Views on feminism and transgender issues
In 2012, Lewis coined what she herself referred to as  "": "the comments on any article about feminism justify feminism".
In January 2013, Lewis edited a week of articles dedicated to transgender issues in the New Statesman, featuring articles by transgender and non-binary writers including Juliet Jacques, Jane Fae and Sky Yarlett. In the introduction, she wrote: "For anyone interested in equality, it should be obvious that trans people are subject to harassment simply for the way they express their gender identity."

While supporting transgender people's right to freedom from harassment and abuse, in July 2017, Lewis wrote about her concerns that gender self-identification would make rape shelters unsafe for women and would lead to an increase in sexual assaults in women's changing rooms, writing: "In this climate, who would challenge someone with a beard exposing their penis in a women's changing room?" In response to criticism for those comments, Lewis said "I've had two tedious years of being abused online as a transphobe and a 'TERF' or 'trans-exclusionary radical feminist'—despite my belief that trans women are women, and trans men are men—because I have expressed concerns about self-ID and its impact on single-sex spaces". In November 2020, game developer Ubisoft removed two in-game podcasts from Watch Dogs: Legion that featured Lewis. This decision was reportedly due to complaints about Lewis' alleged transphobia.

Personal life
Lewis was educated at the private St Mary's School, Worcester and then read English at St Peter's College, Oxford.

Lewis married Guardian journalist Jonathan Haynes in 2015. She was previously married in 2010 and divorced her first husband in 2013.

References

External links

 Contributor page at the Atlantic
 Contributor page at the New Statesman
 Contributor page at The Guardian
 Helen Lewis's blog

1983 births
Living people
Alumni of St Peter's College, Oxford
Alumni of the Open University
Place of birth missing (living people)
British journalists
Internet culture
Radical feminists